Cædmon is the earliest English poet whose name is known.

Caedmon or Cædmon may also refer to:

 Caedmon Audio, a record label
 Caedmon (Band), a short lived British psychedelic folk band
 Caedmon College, a secondary school in Whitby, North Yorkshire, England
 Cædmon manuscript, one of the four major codices of Old English literature
 Caedmon School, an independent Montessori elementary school and preschool in New York City, United States
 Caedmon's Call, a contemporary Christian band
 MV Caedmon, a vehicle and passenger ferry

See also